Darryl Beale (born 23 June 1947) is  a former Australian rules footballer who played with Richmond in the Victorian Football League (VFL) and Central District in the South Australian National Football League (SANFL).

Notes

External links 
		

Living people
1947 births
Australian rules footballers from Victoria (Australia)
Richmond Football Club players
Yarrawonga Football Club players
Central District Football Club players